Irina Antanasijević (27 June 1965) is a Russian and Serbian philologist, literary critic, and translator. She received her Doctor of philological sciences degree in 2002 and has been a professor of Russian literature at Philology Faculty of University in Belgrade since 2004.  Her scholarly interests include folklore and post-folklore, visual literature and visual text, poetics of comics, illustration, children's literature, and history of Russian emigration studies.

Biography 

Born in the city of Sievierodonetsk, Luhansk Oblast, Ukrainian SSR, USSR. After arriving to Yugoslavia she lived in Split, and since 1991 till 1999 in Priština. She worked as lecturer, and then as an assistant for Russian literature at Philology Faculty in Priština. She defended her thesis “Landscape in Russian and Serbian Epic” during the NATO bombing of Yugoslavia in 1999.

She left Priština after the signing of Kumanovo Agreement (June 1999) and moved to Niš. She worked as professor of Russian literature at Philosophy Faculty in Niš and continued to work at Philosophy Faculty in Priština (with the seat in Kosovska Mitrovica). In 2002 she defended doctoral thesis „Poetics of Dirge“. She initiated opening of the Department for Slavistics with Balcanistics at Philology Faculty in Niš (since 2002 Department for Russian language and literature).

Professor of Russian literature at Philology Faculty of University in Belgrade. Member of Editorial Board of journal Gradina until 2009. Member of Editorial Board of periodical Facta universitatis until 2010. Member of Editorial Board of periodical Научный результат, Серия Социальные и гуманитарные исследования (Scientific Result, Series of Social and Humanitarian Studies).

Awards 

 Medal of Pushkin (Russian Federation, November 24, 2021) - for a great contribution to the promotion of the Russian language and Russian culture in Serbia.

Bibliography 
Monographs
 Landscape in Russian and Serbian Folk Epics (Пејзаж у руској и српској народној епици), Prosveta, Niš, 2005, 126 p. 
 Poetics of Russian Dirges (Поетика руских тужбалица), Prosveta, Niš, 2003, 210 p. 
 Folklore and Avant-garde: symbols and phenomena (Фольклор и авангард: символы и явления), Niš, Gradac: Despot Book, 2011, 253 p. 
 Russian Comics in the Kingdom of Yugoslavia (Русский комикс Королевства Югославия), Novi Sad, Komiko, 2014, 340 p. 
 Russian Classic in Pictures (Русская классика в картинках), Belgrade: Philology Faculty of University of Belgrade, 2015 (Belgrade: Belpak), Библиотека Язык и литература. Серия Русская эмиграция в Белграде ; кн. 7, 

Dictionaries
 Dictionary of general words and expressions (Лексикон општих речи и израза), Budva, Kuća knjige, 2007 , 753 p. 
 Dictionary, Russian-Serbian Serbian-Russian (Речник руско-српски српско-руски), Budva, Kuća knjige, 2007 , 832 p. 
 Phrase book, Russian-Serbian Serbian-Russian (Разговорник руско-српски српско-руски), Budva, Kuća knjige, 2007 , 192 p.

Textbooks and manuals
 Russian for students of biology and ecology (Руски језик за студенте биологије и екологије), Niš — Srpsko Sarajevo, 2002, 190 p. 
 Russian for students of physics (Руски језик за студенте физике), Niš — Srpsko Sarajevo, 2001, UDK: 808. 2:53(075. 8), 185 p.

References

External links 
 Irina Antanasijević, a full bio-bibliography (Ирина Антанасијевић, био-библиографија), Project Rastko – Russia (Serb)
 Personal page at Academia.edu

1965 births
Living people
People from Sievierodonetsk
Philologists
Slavists
Serbian translators
Russian translators
Serbian folklorists
Russian folklorists
Women folklorists
Women philologists
Serbian people of Russian descent
Russian studies scholars
Linguists from Serbia
Serbian educators
Textbook writers
Women textbook writers
Women science writers
Women linguists
21st-century philologists
21st-century linguists
21st-century women scientists
21st-century Serbian educators
21st-century Serbian women writers
21st-century women educators
21st-century translators
Russian people of Serbian descent